The Virginmarys are an English rock duo from Macclesfield, England. The band formed in 2009 as a trio and self-released a limited series of sold out EPs, before releasing their debut album King of Conflict on DoubleCross/Cooking Vinyl and Wind Up Records (US) in February 2013. The album was awarded Editors Choice by iTunes US following their songs "Bang Bang Bang" and "Just A Ride" both being iTunes Singles Of The Week and was then nominated for Album Of The Year at the Classic Rock Awards 2013. In 2013, The Virginmarys were crowned Best Breakthrough act at the Classic Rock Awards. "Motherless Land", the first single from the band's second LP, Divides, was released on 16 February 2016. Produced by Gil Norton, Divides was released on 6 May 2016 via Wind-up Records.

Biography
The band formed as a trio in Macclesfield in 2009. The band spent much of their early years touring extensively; they first played the Download Festival in 2010, and have toured as support act to Slash, Shinedown, Terrorvision, Skunk Anansie, Eagles of Death Metal, The View, Ash, Feeder, Queens Of The Stone Age and We Are Scientists, as well as playing their own headline gigs throughout UK, Europe, US and Japan.  The band released a series of self-financed E.P.s during this period, and recorded their first mini-album, Cast the First Stone, in 2010, produced by Toby Jepson and mixed by Mike Fraser.

In late 2011 the band, started work on their debut full-length album, again with Toby Jepson as producer (Chris Sheldon mixed the album), and continued to tour. They wanted the freedom to make their own album and in 2012 they announced record deals with both Double Cross / Cooking Vinyl (in Europe), Wind Up Records (United States) and Hydrant Music (Japan). The debut album, titled King of Conflict, was released on 4 February 2013. On 14 November 2013 they were named Best Breakthrough act at the 2013 Classic Rock Awards.

In 2015 production began for their second album, Divides, produced by Gil Norton. The record was released on 6 May 2016 release via Wind-up Records.

Band members
Ally Dickaty- vocals, guitar (2008–present)
Danny Dolan - drums, (2008–present)
Matt Rose - bass, vocals (2009–December 2016)
Ross Massey - Touring bass (2017–present)

Discography

Studio albums

EPs and mini albums
Cast the First Stone (2010)
Just a Ride (2011)
Portrait of Red (2011)
Dead Man's Shoes (2012)
Sitting Ducks (2017)

Singles

References

External links
Official The Virginmarys website
Virginmarys VEVO
Windup Records

British musical trios
Rock music duos
English rock music groups
Musical groups from Cheshire
People from Macclesfield